Unto may refer to:
 Unto (name)
Unto a Good Land (Swedish: Invandrarna) is a novel by Vilhelm Moberg from 1952
Unto Ashes, musical ensemble based in New York City incorporating madrigal, folk, New Age music and Dark Wave
Unto the Fourth Generation, fantasy short story by Isaac Asimov
Unto The King (album), Christian music album
Unto the Sons, 1992 book by Gay Talese
Unto the Third Generation, 1913 American short silent romantic drama
Unto the Weak, 1914 American silent short drama film
Unto These Hills, outdoor historical drama staged annually in Cherokee, North Carolina
Unto This Last, essay on economy by John Ruskin